A screw thread, often shortened to thread, is a helical structure used to convert between rotational and linear movement or force. A screw thread is an inclined plane wrapped around a cylinder or cone in the form of a helix, with the former being called a straight thread and the latter called a tapered thread. More screw threads are produced each year than any other machine element.

Threads are generally produced according to one of the many standards of thread systems. Standards Development Organizations such as the American National Standards Institute, American Society of Mechanical Engineers, SAE International, International Organization for Standardization, Deutsches Institut für Normung (German Institute for Standardization), British Association and others produce these standards for manufacturers to follow when producing threaded components.

Currently used thread standards

Obsolete thread standards

See also
ISO metric screw thread
"History of standardization" section of the screw thread article

Notes

References

Lists of standards
Screws